, better known by her stage name , was a Japanese female mixed martial artist and a professional wrestler. She started her career as a pro wrestler in 1996 before starting to compete in mixed martial arts from 2001. Aya Koyama died on 27 August 2018 at the age of 45 due to cancer.

Career 
She debuted in 1996 as a professional wrestler with JDStar and later competed for promotions such as All Japan Women's Pro Wrestling and Big Japan Pro Wrestling. In 2001, she took a brief break from professional wrestling to focus in the mixed martial arts. However, she returned to wrestling in 2005 by using the name "Aliya".

She began competing professionally in MMA from May 2001 and lost her opening match to Anna Kopyrina (on 3 May 2001). She faced disastrous start during her mixed martial arts career by losing her first five consecutive matches and ended her career with 4 wins, 10 losses and 1 draw (4-10-1). She fought her last MMA match while she was battling with level 4 cancer on 10 October 2010 following her comeback to mixed martial arts after six years and lost it to Miki Morifuji.

Mixed martial arts record

See also 
List of female mixed martial artists

References 

1973 births
2018 deaths
Japanese female mixed martial artists
Mixed martial artists utilizing wrestling
Mixed martial artists utilizing kickboxing
Japanese female professional wrestlers
Deaths from cancer in Japan
People from Wakayama (city)